Alleviat is the second full-length album by Norwegian metal band Benea Reach. The album was released in Scandinavia on February 4, 2008, and on January 6, 2009 in the United States.

The album was mixed at Antfarm Studios by Danish producer Tue Madsen.

Track listing
All lyrics and music by Benea Reach

"Awakening" - 3:40
"New Waters" - 3:25
"Lionize" - 6:21
"Sentiment" - 3:20
"Reason" - 5:56
"Legacy" - 3:43
"Rejuvenate" - 4:37
"Illume" - 3:54
"Zenith" - 4:29
"Unconditional" - 4:33
"Dominion" - 6:24

Credits
Benea Reach
Ilkka Volume - vocals and lyricism
Hakon Sagen - guitars, lap steel guitar, bass guitar on "Illume", chorus background vocals on "Legacy" and "Dominion",[composing, lyricism, additional bass guitar on "Rejuvenate"
Martin Sivertsen - guitars, composing on "Sentiment"
Marco Storm - drums, bass guitar on all tracks except "Illume", guitars on "Awakening", sampling, synthesizer, composing, lyricism, album art and layout
Alwin Nedrum - Digital Audio, Noise, Keyboards, Backing Vocals
Christer Espevoll - Guitars

Production
Christian Wibe - Production,  additional synthesizer on "Awakening"
Tue Madsen - Audio Mixing, Additional Sampler on "Dominion"
Maria Solheim - Vocals on "Reason"
Mikael Wildén - vocals on "Reason"
Marte Lavik - vocals on "Rejuvenate" and "Illume"
Lars Pettersen - Photography

References

2008 albums
Benea Reach albums